Julie is a popular Latin first name which originally comes from the Latin Julia which could mean youthful, soft-haired, beautiful or vivacious. It is the feminine form of Julius, and can be a pet form of Julia, Yulie, or Juliette.

Popularity
Julie has perpetually been one of the most popular female names used in the United States. According to the United States' Social Security Administration, Julie was consistently in the top one-hundred registered female names in the forty years between 1951 and 1991; peaking at #10 in 1971. Additionally, a variation of the name Julie, Julia has been in the top one-hundred since 1980.

Julie has also been a popular given name in some European countries. In the most recently available statistics, the name was the fourth most popular female name in Belgium in 2005 and ninth most popular in Denmark in the first half of 2005. In France, the name was only mildly popular in the beginning of the 20th century and its usage nearly disappeared between 1940 and 1970. It then suddenly soared to previously unknown heights, reaching its peak in 1987 when 9,908 Julies were born. It was the 17th most popular name in 2006. Julie may be given to males as well, though mostly as a second or third given name. In 2006, 204 Frenchmen had Julie among their given names.

History
The first appearance of Julie in a popular non-French literary work occurred with Swedish playwright August Strindberg's tragedy Miss Julie in 1888. As it became one of the most widely performed plays in the English-speaking world, the choice of Julie as a name expanded along with it.

People

Given name
 Julie Adams (1926–2019), American actress
 Julie Raque Adams (born 1969), American politician
 Julie Andrews (born 1935), English actress, singer, director and author
 Julie Benz (born 1972), American actress
 Julie Bergan (born 1994), Norwegian singer-songwriter
 Julie Bergner, American mathematician
 Saint Julie Billiart (1751–1816), French nun
 Julie Bindel (born 1962), British feminist
 Julie Bishop (born 1956), Australian politician
 Julie Bishop (actress) (1914–2001), American actress
 Julie Blanchette (born 1986), Canadian ringette player
 Julie Bowen (born 1970), American actress
 Julie Burchill (born 1959), an English writer and columnist
 Julie Chen (born 1970), American television news anchor and producer
 Julie Christie (born 1941), British actress
 Julie Chu (born 1982), American ice hockey player
 Julie Clarke (born 1971), American model and actress
 Julie Coin (born 1982), French tennis player
 Julie Cournoyer (born 1970 or 1971), Canadian para-cyclist
 Julie Czerneda (born 1955), Canadian author
 Julie C. Dao, American author
 Julie Dash (born 1952), American film director
 Julie d'Aubigny (1670-1707), French opera singer, Mademoiselle Maupin
 Julie Dawn (1920–2000), English singer
 Julie Dawn Cole (born 1955), English actress
 Julie Delpy (born 1969), French-American actress, director, screenwriter and singer-songwriter
 Julie Diana, American ballet dancer, teacher, writer and arts administrator
 Julie Dickson, Canadian public servant
 Julie Ditty (born 1979), American tennis player
 Julie Doiron, Canadian musician
 Julie Dore (born 1960), British politician
 Julie Dorsey, American computer scientist
 Julie Dzerowicz, Canadian politician
 Julie Nixon Eisenhower (born 1948), American author, daughter of former President Richard Nixon
 Julie Feeney, Irish singer and composer
 Julie Fernandez-Fernandez (born 1972), Belgian politician
 Julie Forss (born 1998), Finnish footballer
 Julie Foudy (born 1971), American soccer player
 Julie Fowlis, Scottish singer and composer
 Julie Goodyear (born 1942), English actress
 Julie Halard-Decugis (born 1970), French tennis player
 Julie Harris (1925–2013), American actress
 Julie Haseler, Australian actress, writer and singer
 Julie Heldman (born 1945), American tennis player
 Julie Hilling (born 1959), British politician
 Julie Holland (born 1965), American psycho-pharmacologist, psychiatrist, and author
 Julie Ivy, American health care statistician
 Julie Kavner (born 1950), American actress
 Julie Kent (born 1969), American ballet dancer
 Julie Lemieux (born 1962), Canadian voice actress
 Julie Lemieux (politician), Canadian politician
 Julie London (1926–2000), American singer and actress
 Julie V. Lund (born 1959), American judge
 Julie McNiven (born 1980), American actress
 Julie Mennell (born 1970), English academic
 Julie Mond, American actress
 Julie Morstad, Canadian writer and illustrator
 Julie Newmar (born 1933), American actress, dancer and singer
 Julie Owono (born c. 1987), French and Cameroonian lawyer
 Julie Payette (born 1963), Canadian astronaut and engineer
 Julie Powell (1973–2022), American author
 Julie Pullin (born 1975), British tennis player
 Julie Rayne, English singer
 Julie Reeves (born 1974), American country singer-songwriter
 Julie Reuben (born 1960), American historian
 Julie Roberts (born 1979), American country singer-songwriter
 Julie Roberts (artist) (born 1963), Welsh painter
 Julie Robinson (disambiguation), multiple people
 Julie Roginsky (born 1973), American political strategist and television commentator
 Julie Rosen (born 1957), American politician
 Julie Rrap (born 1950), Australian artist
 Julie Rubio (born 1969), American film producer and director
 Julie Salamon (born 1953), American journalist and author
 Julie Salinger (1863–1942), German politician
 Julie Salmon (born 1965), British tennis player
 Julie Sanders, British academic
 Julie Sandstede, American politician
 Julie Saunders (bowls), English bowls player
 Julie Seitter, American voice actress
 Julie Shigekuni (born 1962), American writer
 Julie Smith (disambiguation), multiple people
 Julie Sommars (born 1940), American actress
 Julie Spira, American relationship counselor and writer
 Julie Stevens (disambiguation), multiple people
 Julie Stewart (born 1967), Canadian actress and television director
 Julie Stewart-Binks (born 1987), Canadian television sports journalist
 Julie Strain (born 1962), American actress and model
 Julie Talma (1756–1805), French dancer and courtesan
 Julie Tan (born 1992), Maylasian actress
 Julie Taymor (born 1952), American director of theatre, opera and film
 Julie Theriot (born 1967), American microbiologist
 Julie Thomas (born 1967), Welsh lawn bowler
 Julie Thomas, first Chief Minister of Saint Helena
 Julie Todaro, American librarian
 Julie Tolentino, American dancer and choreographer
 Julie Tremble, Canadian experimental filmmaker
 Julie Tristan, American television journalist
 Julie Underwood, American education school dean
 Julie Umerle, American-born British painter
 Julie Van Espen (1996–2019), Belgian homicide victim
 Julie VanOrden, American politician
 Julie Vargas (born 1938), American educator
 Julie Vega (1968–1985), Filipina child actress
 Julie Verhoeven (born 1969), British illustrator and designer
 Julie Vinter Hansen (1890–1960), Dutch astronomer
 Julie Vlasto (1903–1985), French tennis player
 Julie Vollertsen (born 1959), American volleyball player
 Julie Marie Wade (born 1979), American writer and professor
 Julie Wainwright, American business executive
 Julie T. Wallace (born 1961), English actress
 Julie Walters (born 1950), English actress and novelist
 Julie Ward (judge), Australian judge
 Julie Ward (politician) (born 1957), British politician
 Julie Warner (born 1965), American actress
 Julie White (born 1967), British businesswoman
 Julie Willis, Australian architectural historian
 Julie Wilson (1924–2015), American singer and actress
 Julie Wolfthorn (1864–1944), German painter
 Julie Yorn (born 1967), American film producer
 Julie Zahra (born 1982), Maltese singer
 Julie Zeilinger (born 1993), American feminist writer
 Julie Zenatti (born 1981), French singer and television personality
 Julie Zetlin (born 1990), American rhythmic gymnast
 Julie Zhuo, Chinese-American computer scientist
 Julie Zickefoose (born 1958), American biologist and nature writer
 Julie Zogg (born 1992), Swiss snowboarder
 Julie Zwarthoed (born 1994), Dutch ice hockey player
 Julie Zwillich (born 1969), American-Canadian actress and television personality

Nickname
 Jules Julie Archoska (1905–1972), American football player
 Julius La Rosa (1930–2016), American pop music singer
 Julius J. Radice (1908–1966), American athlete and physician
 Julius Schwartz (1915–2004), American comics editor
 Julius Seligson (1909–1987), American tennis player

Mononyms
 Julie (Julie Berthelsen), a Danish pop singer and songwriter
 Julie (Kenji Sawada), a Japanese pop singer, composer and actor

Characters
 Julie, a character in 1993 action/martial arts movie Showdown
 Julie, a character in the 2007 British black comedy TV movie Dead Clever
 Julie Albright, title character of the book series in the American Girls collection
 Julie Tournier, one the main titular character in the 1990s animated show The Twins of Destiny
 Julie Hinikawa, the main antagonist of Hi Hi Puffy AmiYumi
 Julie, one of the Season 2 and 3 kids of Barney & Friends
 Julie Molina, the main character of Julie and the Phantoms

Alternative spellings and translations
Jewelia 
Julia (Latin), (English), (German), (Interlingua), (Polish), (Bulgarian), (Spanish)
Julie (Czech), (Danish),  (English), (French), (Norwegian)
Juliino (Esperanto)
Giulia (Italian)
Júlia (Portuguese)
Júlia (Catalan)
Júlia (Hungarian)
July (English)
Juli (English)
Iulia or Ioulia (Ιουλία) (Greek)
Julia 
Jorna, Jillie, Jennifer, Julia (Swedish)
Juulia (Finnish)
Yulia, Yulya, Yuliya (Russian / Ukrainian)
Yula, Yuliya (Assyrian)
Iulia, Iuliana (Romanian)
Yulie (Hebrew, Spanish)
Juri (Japanese)

Rare spelling
Jully, the given name of Canadian singer Jully Black
Juleigh, the given name of a formalist poet Juleigh Howard-Hobson
Jewellee
Jewelia
Julee

References

See also
Julia (given name)
Yulia
Special:AllPages/Julie

English feminine given names
French feminine given names

ca:Júlia (nom)
it:Giulia